Word Of Honor, previously titled A Tale of the Wanderers (天涯客), is a 2021 Chinese costume streaming television series co-produced by Ciwen Media, and Youku, directed by Cheng Zhi Chao, Ma Hua Gan, and Li Hong Yu, written by Xiao Chu, adapted from the danmei novel "Faraway Wanderers" (天涯客) by Priest. It starred Zhang Zhehan (Chinese: 张哲瀚) and Gong Jun (Chinese: 龚俊) in the leading roles. The series aired on Youku from February 22 to May 5 with 36 episodes, plus a short bonus clip shows what happened after the end of the main series.

It was featured on Teen Vogue's best BL dramas of 2021 list. The drama series were taken down from Chinese online video platforms in August 2021 due to industry boycott against Zhang.

Synopsis 
The leader of assassin organisation "The Window of Heaven", Zhou Zishu (played by Zhang Zhehan), quits his position in pursuit of freedom with drastic measures. During his travels, he meets Wen Kexing (played by Gong Jun), the reclusive leader of Ghost Valley who wants nothing but revenge. The two become entangled in various machinations within the martial arts world, and eventually become soulmates instrumental in each other's redemption. One conspiracy, two soulmates, five pieces of treasure, twenty years of grievances, and thousands of years of jianghu dreams have tied their destinies closely together.

Cast

Main

Supporting

Ghost Valley (Mountain Qingya) 
A place where the most evil people in the world with nowhere else to go, gather.

Imperial Court and The Window of Heaven
One of the two most famous assassin organisations operating primarily in the north, The Window of Heaven is led by Helian Yi, Prince of Jin, used in his schemes in his bid for the throne.

Scorpion Sect
One of the two most famous assassin organizations operating primarily in the south, the Scorpion Sect is led by Scorpion King.

Five Lakes Alliance 
Consists of the five great sects and their respective leaders:

Hei Zi as Gao Chong (voiced by Yang Mo), head of the Five Lakes Alliance and leader of Yue Yang Sect
Zhang Jia Hang as Gao Chong (young)
Wang Ruo Lin as Zhao Jing (voiced by Guo Hao Ran), leader of Tai Hu Sect; known as the San Bai Hero; in control of the Scorpion Sect; Xi Sang Ghost's former lover
Tian Mu Yang as Zhao Jing (young)
Guo Jia Hao as Shen Shen (voiced by Qi Si Jia), leader of Da Gu Shan Sect
Chang Yuan Jia as Shen Shen (young)
Chang Jin as Zhang Yusen, leader of Jing Hu Mountain Pavilion (Mirror lake sect); Zhang Chengling's father
Zhou Tai Heng (周泰亨) as Zhang Yusen (young)
Yang Han as Lu Taichong, leader of Dan Yang Sect

Yue Yang Sect
Jin Le as Gao Xiaolian (voiced by *Nie Xi Ying), Gao Chong's daughter
Yang Wan Li as Deng Kuan (voiced by Liu Si Cen), head disciple of Yue Yang Sect
Yang Zhen as Zhu Yaozhi, disciple of Yue Yang Sect
Tang Yuan Sheng as Gao Shan, disciple of Yue Yang Sect
Tang Shu Ya as Xie Wuyang, disciple of Yue Yang Sect; adopted son of Zhao Jing
Huang Zi Yi (黄子益) as Song Huairen, disciple of Yue Yang Sect

Jing Hu Mountain Pavilion (Mirror lake sect)
Yan Ding Xiang Yu (闫丁翔宇) as Zhang Chengfeng, elder son of Zhang Yusen
Chen Qi (陈启) as Zhang Chengluan, second son of Zhang Yusen

Chang Ming Mountain
Huang You Ming as Ye Baiyi (voiced by Jin Xian), sword immortal of Chang Ming Mountain. A mysterious and highly skilled martial artist who lived for a century. Rong Xuan's teacher 
Li Ming Xuan as Rong Xuan, known as the Feng Shan Sword. Creator of the Martial Arts Library. Ye Baiyi's disciple

Unaffiliated
Wei Zheming as Jing Beiyuan (Seventh Lord) (voiced by Ling Fei): a former prince of Jin Kingdom and Zhou Zishu's old friend. He is the main character of Lord Seventh or Qi Ye, the prequel novel to Tian Ya Ke. Unbeknownst to the rest of the characters, Jing Beiyuan is the destined soulmate of Helian Yi and has died and reincarnated many times before. In his last life, he was sent back to his first life to be the prince again and redo that life. His actions thereafter change the destinies of all those around him, including Zhou Zishu. He may be secretly related to Helian Yi.
Fan Jinwei as Wu Xi (Da Wu) (voiced by Zhang He): the shamanic leader of Nan Jiang and Zhou Zishu's old friend. In his youth, he was a royal hostage in the Kingdom of Jin and grew up in the royal court with Jing Beiyuan, Zhou Zishu, and Helian Yi. He slowly befriends and falls in love with Jing Beiyuan. In the novel, he is sent away by Beiyuan before the final battle against foreign invaders but returns to rescue him and help defeat his enemies. Jing Beiyuan leaves his old life behind and goes to live with Wu Xi at the end of the novel.

Extended cast

《Si Ji Mountain Pavilion (Four Season Manor)》
A former wulin stronghold which has now faded into nonexistence.
Gong Zheng Nan as Qin Huaizhang: master of Si Ji Mountain Pavilion and Zhou Zishu's teacher.
Guo Jianan and Zhang Yuebin (张跃滨) (young) as Qin Jiuxiao: Qin Huaizhang's son and Zhou Zishu's close junior.
Cao Xiyue and Qiao Su (voice) as Princess Jing An: Zhou Zishu's junior and Qin Jiuxiao's lover.

《Long Yuan Pavilion》 
An organization that is adept in traps and machinations.
Zhang Shuangli and Gao Yang (高扬) (young) as Long Que: the old master of Long Yuan Pavilion.
Wang Zirun and Zhang Yuwei (voice) as Long Xiao: the current master of Long Yuan Pavilion and Long Que's son.

《Immortal Physician Valley 》 
Zou Shizhong (邹世中) as the Master of Immortal Physician Valley.
Yu Xinyan as Yue Feng'er: the senior disciple of Immortal Physician Valley and Rong Xuan's wife.
Ji Xiaofei as Zhen Ruyu: Wen Kexing's father.
Ou Ruola as Gu Miaomiao: Wen Kexing's mother.

JIANGHU

《Qing Feng Sword Sect (Gentle Wind Sword Sect)》 
Wang Boqing as Mo Huaiyang: leader of Qing Feng Sword Sect and Cao Weining's teacher.
Wang Kang as Mo Weixu: Mo Huaiyang's son.
Cheng Cheng as Fan Huaikong: elder of Qing Feng Sword Sect.

《Hua Shan Sect》 
One of the sects under the Wu Yue Sword Alliance.
Liu Hanyang as Yu Qiufeng (voiced by Ling Zhenhe): leader of Hua Shan Sect and Liu Qianqiao's former lover.
Jia Yu (嘉裕) as Yu Tianjie: son of Yu Qiufeng.
Kong Lingzi (孔令孜) as He Ruicai: disciple of Hua Shan Sect.

《Tai Shan Sect》 
One of the sects under the Wu Yue Sword Alliance.
Wang Gang as Ao Laizi (voiced by Zhao Mingzhou): leader of Tai Shan Sect.
Zhang Chen as Qing Bo: disciple of Tai Shan Sect.
Liu Ruxuan as Qing Hua: disciple of Tai Shan Sect.
Wang Yilong as Qing Song: disciple of Tai Shan Sect.

《Duan Jian Mountain Pavilion (Broken Sword Manor)》 
Zhao Hongwu as Mu Siyuan: leader of Duan Jian Mountain Pavilion.
Yuan Shuai as Mu Yunge: disciple of Duan Jian Mountain Pavilion.

《Beggar Sect》 
Wei Jia (魏甲) as the Leader of Beggar Sect.
Kou Zhenhai as Huang He (voiced by Zhang Yaohan): elder of Beggar Sect.
Zhou Xiaopeng as Lu Liu (voiced by Liu Cong).
Ma Lan as Tao Hong (voiced by Ma Cheng).

《Four Sages of An Ji》 
Yu Zikuan as He Yifan: a former bandit who turned good.
Zhang Zhiwei as Du Yuqian.
Lu Chunsheng as Pei Feng: husband of Qiao Xing.
Tong Xiaomei as Qiao Xing: wife of Pei Feng.

Others
Huang Bixing as Feng Xiaofeng.
Wang Gang as Gao Shan Nu.
Yu Aiqun as Ci Mu Da Shi: master of Shao Lin Temple.
Zhao Yongzhan as the Leader of Cao Sect.
Ren Xihong as Wang Moxuan: Leader of Ju Jing Sect.
Han Haoxiang as the Second Generation Leader of Ju Jing Sect.
Xu Wei as the Leader of Hai Sha Sect.
Song Yagang as the Leader of Tiezhang Sect.
Wang Chong (王崇) as the Leader of Wu Hu Duan Jian Sect.
Li Tongdong as the Leader of Fu Niu Sect.
Hou Quanlong (侯全龙) as Sun Zhong: Leader of Ying Zhua Sect.
Shen Baoping as Uncle Li: old boat captain who gives Zhou Zishu the responsibility of sending Zhang Chengling safely to the Five Lakes Alliance.
Zhao Qihang as Ping An: Jing Beiyuan's disciple
Wu Kunyi as A Qin Lai: Jing Beiyuan's subordinate
Fu Rou Mei Qi as Yun Zai: a courtesan saved by Gu Xiang.
Ren Yixuan as Hong Lu: a courtesan saved by Gu Xiang.
Li Man (李曼) as Yan Wan: disciple of Emei Sect and Mu Yunge's lover.
Yang Mo as Fang Buzhi: a famous thief known as Jiu Zhua Ling Hu.
Wei Yu as Minister Li: the military commissioner and Princess Jing An's father, killed by Zhou Zishu.
Wang Xingyi as Green Clothed Swordsman: assassin and guard of the military commissioner manor.
Yan Yan as Yue Rong.
Yun Xiang as Bi Xingming.
Lu Jin as Zhi Yin Shi Tai.
Wang Haochen (王皓晨) as Deng Kuan's son.
Hao Jianchun (郝荐椿) as Meng Po.
Wu Lin as Gui Mian Ke.
Cheng Wanchuan (成万川) as Luo Hao.
Lu Huan as Uncle Lin.
Wang Pin as Cheng Zichen.
Liu Meixi as Zhang Nianxiang.

Soundtrack
Word of Honor OST (山河令 网剧音乐原声大碟) consisted of 13 tracks, sung by various artists.

Production
In June 2020, the main leads Zhang Zhehan and Gong Jun were announced along with the production team. On the same day, the filming ceremony was held. On July 18, a fanmeeting was held. The series was filmed from June 3 to September 23 at Hengdian World Studios.

Concert

‘Word of Honor’ Theme Concert took place on the 3 and 4 of May 2021, in the gymnasium of the Suzhou Olympic Sports Centre. The main leads Zhang Zhehan, Gong Jun, Zhou Ye, Ma Wenyuan, and Sun Xilun attended the shows along with supporting cast members Zhao Qian (Du Pusa), Huang You Ming (Ye Baiyi), Li Dai Kun (Xie Wang), Hei Zi (Gao Chong), Chen Zi Han (Luo Fumeng), Jin Le (Gao Xiaolian), Ke Nai Yu (Liu Qianqiao), Wang Ruo Lin (Zhao Jin), Guo Jia Hao (Shen Shen), Fan Jinwei (Wu Xi), Guo Yun Fei (Duan Pengjiu), and Wang Rong (Han Ying). Over 600,000 people participated in the tickets purchased, but only 40,000 seats available. The tickets sold out within 40 seconds. Online tickets were also available for livestream through media platform Youku, costing CN¥68 (US$10) per day.

International broadcast

Awards and nominations

References

External links 
 

2020s Chinese television series
Television shows based on Chinese novels
Youku original programming
Chinese wuxia television series